Cumberland is a former United Kingdom Parliamentary constituency. It was a constituency of the House of Commons of the Parliament of England then of the Parliament of Great Britain from 1707 to 1800 and of the Parliament of the United Kingdom from 1801 to 1832. It was represented by two Knights of the Shire. It was divided between the constituencies of Cumberland East and Cumberland West in 1832.

Members of Parliament

 Constituency created 1290

MPs 1290–1640

MPs 1640–1832

Constituency abolished (1832)

Notes

Elections

The county franchise, from 1430, was held by the adult male owners of freehold land valued at 40 shillings or more. Each elector had as many votes as there were seats to be filled. Votes had to be cast by a spoken declaration, in public, at the hustings, which took place in the town of Cockermouth. The expense and difficulty of voting at only one location in the county, together with the lack of a secret ballot contributed to the corruption and intimidation of electors, which was widespread in the unreformed British political system.

The expense, to candidates, of contested elections encouraged the leading families of the county to agree on the candidates to be returned unopposed whenever possible. Contested county elections were therefore unusual.

Election results

Election results taken from the History of Parliament Trust series.

Elections in the 18th century

Note: James Lowther succeeded his brother as baronet in 1731

Death of Pennington

incomplete

On petition, Fletcher returned in place of Lowther, 16 December 1768

incomplete

See also

List of former United Kingdom Parliament constituencies
Unreformed House of Commons

References
 D. Brunton & D. H. Pennington, Members of the Long Parliament (London: George Allen & Unwin, 1954)
 Henry Stooks Smith, The Parliaments of England from 1715 to 1847 (2nd edition, edited by F. W. S. Craig – Chichester: Parliamentary Reference Publications, 1973)
 House of Commons records at British History Online 

History of Cumberland
Parliamentary constituencies in North West England (historic)
Constituencies of the Parliament of the United Kingdom established in 1290
Constituencies of the Parliament of the United Kingdom disestablished in 1832